Lee Brimmicombe-Wood (born 7 December 1963 in London) is a British designer of board games and video games. He also wrote Aliens: Colonial Marines Technical Manual.

References 

British video game designers
Board game designers
Writers from London
1963 births
Living people